Gebze Technical University, formerly known as Gebze Institute of Technology (GIT),  is one of two institutes of technology founded in Turkey; The other one is İzmir Institute of Technology. It is a university for undergraduate and graduate studies and research activities located in a specifically selected area in Gebze, one of the most industrialized regions of the Marmara Region. Gebze Technical University is one of the universities that hold the title "research university" in Turkey, which "research university" title is given based on university's academic output by Council of Higher Education

Research
Although it is a fairly new undergraduate institution, GTU has held the fifth place among all universities in Turkey, and the first place among the state universities for number of publications per person by having increased the number of scientific publications in international publications to 153 by 2008.

Establishment
Gebze Technical University was founded in 1992 under the name of Gebze Institute of Technology. Gebze Technical University (GTU) was established upon the foundations and experience of Gebze Institute of Technology (GIT) with the decree dated 4 November 2014 of the Grand National Assembly of Turkey, interiting and embracing GIT's 22-year heritage.

Education
The institute, which has been giving education at graduate level in its four faculties since 1994, began to offer undergraduate education in the departments of Physics, Mathematics, Materials Science, Computer Engineering and Electronics Engineering in 2001 and Architecture and Business in 2008. All education programs are supported with English (30%). GTU has 926 undergraduate and 1275 graduate students and employs a total of 388 academic personnel, 158 of whom held doctoral degrees.

Faculties and departments
Faculty of Sciences 
Physics
Mathematics
Chemistry
Molecular Biology and Genetics
Faculty of Engineering 
Computer Engineering
Electronics Engineering
Materials Science
Design and Manufacturing Engineering
Energy Systems Engineering
Geodetic and Photogrammetric Engineering
Environmental Engineering
Chemical Engineering
Bioengineering
Faculty of Architecture
Architecture
Urban and Regional Planning
Industrial Product Design
Faculty of Business Administration
Business
Economics
Strategics
Institutes
Institute of Engineering and Natural Sciences
Institute of Social Sciences
Institute of Earthquake and Structural Sciences
Institute of Defense Technologies
Departments Subordinate to Rectorate
Foreign Languages
Informatics Department

Campuses
The university consists of one campus, Çayırova Campus , which is still under construction.

Çayırova Campus
Being the first and the main campus of Gebze Technical University, Çayırova Campus is located 10 kilometers away from Gebze city center toward İstanbul. The campus is of 1.400.000 m². The rector's office, administrative bodies, library, and classrooms for the entire undergraduate and a number of graduate studies are located in Çayırova Campus.

Muallimköy Campus (permenantly shut down), with its 3,800,000 m² area, is still under construction but Environmental Engineering, Geodetic and Photogrammetric Engineering, Biology and Chemistry departments have been continuing their research there since 2002. It is planned to contain most of the departments and a 500-person capacity dormitory facility. The İstanbul-Ankara TEM highway passes very near the campus. In 2014, the faculties and departments on the muallimköy campus were moved to the Çayırova Campus. Muallimköy campus land was transferred to the Ministry of Industry and Technology.

Facilities

Library
GTU Library, as well as possessing more than 10,000 books and 222 periodicals, provides direct access to 9,705 electronic journals on eight databases.

Laboratories
GTU has 79 research and/or teaching laboratories. Every major department has its own computer network and laboratory for its students. In addition, public computer laboratories are available workdays and weekends.

Students life
The societies active at GTU are:
 Astronomy and Physics Society
 IEEE Student Branch
 IT Club
 Music Society 
 Photography and Drawing Society
 Robot Society
 Sport Society
 1907 UNIFEB GYTE
 Dance Club
 Nature Sports and Climbing
 GTU Rowing Crew
 UltrAslan GYTE
 UNIBJK GYTE
 Theater Club

See also
 İzmir Institute of Technology

References

External links

 GTU Web Site
 Gebze
 GTU Erasmus

Technical universities and colleges in Turkey
Institutes of Technology in Turkey
Kocaeli Province
Educational institutions established in 1992
Buildings and structures in Kocaeli Province
1992 establishments in Turkey
Gebze
State universities and colleges in Turkey